Margit Barnay (born Margit Jana Rosenstock; 5 April 1896 – 11 January 1974) was a German film actress of the silent era.

Selected filmography
 The Boy in Blue (1919)
 Satan (1920)
 From the Files of a Respectable Woman (1920)
 The Skull of Pharaoh's Daughter (1920)
 The Stranger from Alster Street (1921)
 The Woman in the Trunk (1921)
 The Experiment of Professor Mithrany (1921)
 The Sleeping Volcano (1922)
 Only One Night (1922)
 The Love Nest (1922)
 The Love Story of Cesare Ubaldi (1922)
 The Tigress (1922)
 Women Who Commit Adultery (1922)
 Bigamy (1922)
 Don Juan (1922)
 The Good Comrade (1923)
 King of Women (1923)
 I Had a Comrade (1923)
 The Beautiful Girl (1923)
 We'll Meet Again in the Heimat (1926)
 Two Under the Stars (1927)
 Benno Stehkragen (1927)

References

Bibliography

External links

1896 births
1974 deaths
German silent film actresses
20th-century German actresses
Actresses from Berlin